Lanvin is a French luxury fashion house based in Paris. Founded in 1889 by Jeanne Lanvin, it is the oldest French fashion house still in operation. Since 2018, it has been a subsidiary of Shanghai-based Lanvin Group. Bruno Sialelli, a 31-year-old French designer, was named Creative Director of Lanvin in January 2019.

History

Lanvin made clothes for her daughter, Marie-Blanche de Polignac, which began to attract the attention of a number of wealthy people, who requested copies for their own children. Soon, Lanvin was making dresses for their mothers, and some of the most famous names in Europe were included in the clientele of her new boutique on the rue du Faubourg Saint-Honoré, Paris. In 1909, Lanvin joined the Syndicat de la Couture, which marked her formal status as a couturière. The Lanvin logo was inspired by a photograph taken for Jeanne Lanvin as she attended a ball with her daughter wearing matching outfits in 1907.

From 1923, the Lanvin empire included a dye factory in Nanterre. In the 1920s, Lanvin opened shops devoted to home decor, menswear, furs and lingerie, but her most significant expansion was the creation of Lanvin Parfums SA in 1924. "My Sin", an animalic-aldehyde based on heliotrope, was introduced in 1925, and is widely considered a unique fragrance. It would be followed by her signature fragrance, Arpège, in 1927, said to have been inspired by the sound of her daughter's practising her scales on the piano.

After Jeanne Lanvin
When Lanvin died in 1946, ownership of the firm was ceded to her daughter Marguerite, who had shared management of the firm from 1942 with a cousin and then a fashion-industry expert. Because Marie-Blanche de Polignac was childless when she died in 1958, the ownership of the House of Lanvin went to a cousin, Yves Lanvin.

From mid-1960s through to the 1996 takeover by L'Oreal, Lanvin was run by Bernard Lanvin.
The export department was in the original factory in Nanterre where all the perfumes were made and bottled. The administrative Head Office was in Paris.
In 1979, Lanvin bought its independence from Squibb USA and a major PR promotional tour was arranged by Paris in the United States in the same year.

Midland Bank bought a stake in the company from the family in March 1989, and installed Léon Bressler to revamp the firm's faded image. However, in February 1990, Midland backed out and sold Lanvin to Orcofi, a French holding company led by the Vuitton family. From Orcofi, 50% of the House of Lanvin was acquired by L'Oréal in 1994, 66% in 1995 and 100% in 1996. Under L'Oréal's diverse umbrella, an array of CEOs who circulate within the French fashion industr directed the company.

Majority owned by Harmonie S.A., 2001–2018
In August 2001, Lanvin  was taken private again by investor group Harmonie S.A., headed by Shaw-Lan Wang, a Taiwanese media magnate. Wang bought out other investors in 2003. 

In 2005, Joix Corporatic became the Lanvin ready-to-wear licence holder in Japan with retail value of €50 million. In Japan, Lanvin clothes are sold under a license owned by conglomerate Itochu, which held 5 percent in the company and in 2007 made an estimated $280 million in sales from Lanvin-branded clothes, more than the couture house made itself.  In 2007, Wang sold Lanvin's perfumes unit to France's Interparfums for 22 million euros, leaving the group without one of the traditional industry vehicles for brand development. That same year, Lanvin moved into profit for the first time in decades. 

On 4 December 2009, Lanvin opened their first US boutique in Bal Harbour, Florida.

In 2011, Lanvin sales reached €203 million, not counting an estimated €4.5 million in revenues from licences. In 2012, Lanvin realized a capital increase of 17.5 million euros as entrepreneur Ralph Bartel increased his stake to 25 percent from 12.5 percent.

On 20 November 2013, Lanvin became the official tailor of Arsenal FC.

On 28 October 2015, Lanvin announced that Elbaz was no longer at the company, due to differences of opinion with the shareholders. He was replaced by Bouchra Jarrar in March 2016. Jarrar left the following year and was succeeded by Olivier Lapidus, who departed on 23 March 2018, after only two seasons. Lapidus' successor was not named upon his exit.

Majority owned by Fosun, 2018–present
In February 2018, Shanghai-based conglomerate Fosun International became the controlling stakeholder in Lanvin when it acquired shares worth €120 million from Wang and Ralph Bartel, who owned 75 per cent and 25 per cent of Arpège SAS, the holding company that owns the “Lanvin” name. After the acquisition, Lanvin appointed Jean-Philippe Hecquet as CEO; Hecquet stepped down in March 2020 after only 18 months. Joann Cheng, chairman of Lanvin's parent company and head of the board of directors of Lanvin, became interim CEO. Fosun Fashion Group was renamed Lanvin Group in October 2021 as the company pursues acquisitions to build a global portfolio of luxury brands.

Creative directors since 2001

Alber Elbaz
In October 2001, Alber Elbaz was appointed the Lanvin artistic director for all activities, including interiors. In 2006, he introduced new packaging for the fashion house, featuring a forget-me-not flower color, Lanvin's favorite shade which she purportedly saw in a Fra Angelico fresco (Suzy Menkes, 2005.).
On 2 September 2010, it was announced by H&M that Lanvin would be their guest designer collaboration for the Winter 2010 collection. The collection would be available to view beginning 4 November 2010 at HM.com. The collection would then be available to buy in 200 stores worldwide, on 20 November, with a first look sale the day before exclusively at the H&M store in Las Vegas. The main face of the collection video was supermodel Natasha Poly.

Lucas Ossendrijver

Lucas Ossendrijver started with Kenzo’s menswear in 1997. In 2000, he moved to Munich where fashion designer Kostas Murkudis gave him free rein over the men’s line. Back in Paris, he then spent four years with Hedi Slimane at Dior Homme: his luxury fashion debut.
In 2006, Lucas Ossendrijver was appointed the head of the men's line. The 2006 men's ready-to-wear collection was inspired by a Jean-Luc Godard film. He launched the first LANVIN urban sneakers, now with their patent leather toe caps, while presenting his AW 2006 collections; the shoes later became available in women’s collections.
While enjoying a revitalized reputation in luxury, Lanvin received mainstream press in the United States in May 2009 when Michelle Obama was photographed wearing a popular line of Lanvin's sneakers made of suede with grosgrain ribbon laces and metallic pink toe caps while volunteering at a Washington, D.C. food bank. The sneaker shoes were reportedly retailed at $540.

Bouchra Jarrar
Bouchra Jarrar was appointed as Creative Director by Lanvin in March 2016.
She is a Permanent Member of the French Chambre Syndicale de la Couture since 2014, she was a Guest Member as of January 2010. She worked as Nicolas Ghesquière’s studio director at Balenciaga for 10 years. In 2006, she moved on to French couture house Christian Lacroix — working alongside the designer as director of haute couture until the company closed  in 2009. She founded her own house in 2010 and earned the official Haute Couture appellation in 2013.

In 2017, and with the preparation of only two ready-to-wear collections, Jarar stepped down from her position. Upon her departure, Lanvin released the following statement: "Lanvin and Bouchra Jarrar have mutually decided to put an end to their collaboration".

Bruno Sialelli 
French designer Bruno Sialelli was named the new creative director of Lanvin in January 2019. Lanvin revealed in a statement that Sialelli's appointment marks a "pivotal new direction". Sialelli had worked with Jonathan Anderson at Spanish brand Loewe prior to the appointment and was presumed to be facing "great pressure to turn things around for the maison."

Directors 
 1946–1950, Lanvin's daughter Marie-Blanche de Polignac, owner and director
 1942–1950, Marie-Blanche's cousin Jean Gaumont-Lanvin (Colombes, 1908–Versailles, 1988), director general
 1950–1955, Daniel Gorin (Paris, 1891–Paris, 1972), director general
 1959, Marie-Blanche's cousin Yves Lanvin, owner; Madame Yves Lanvin, president.
 1989–1990, Léon Bressler, chairperson
 1990–1993, Michel Pietrini, chairperson
 1993–1995, Loïc Armand, chairperson
 1995–2001, Gérald Asaria, chairperson
 2001–2004, Jacques Lévy, director general
 2021–today, Siddhartha Shukla, CEO

Designers 
 1946–1958: Marie-Blanche de Polignac, director general and designer
 1950–1963: Antonio del Castillo, women's collections
 1960–1980: Bernard Devaux, hats, scarves, haute couture; women's "Diffusions" line 1963–1980,
 1964–1984: Jules-François Crahay (Liège, 1917–1988), haute couture collections and "Boutique de Luxe"
 1972: Christian Benais, men's ready-to-wear collection
 1976–1991: Patrick Lavoix, men's ready-to-wear collections
 1981–1989: Maryll Lanvin, ready-to-wear, first haute couture in 1985 and women's "Boutique" collections
 1989–1990: Robert Nelissen, women's ready-to-wear collections
 1990–1992: Claude Montana, five haute-couture collections
 1990–1992: Eric Bergère, women's ready-to-wear collections
 1992–2001: Dominique Morlotti, women's and men's ready-to-wear collections
 1996–1998: Ocimar Versolato, women's ready-to-wear collections
 1998–2002: Cristina Ortiz, women's ready-to-wear collections
 2002–2015: Alber Elbaz, artistic director of all creative activities
 2003–2006: Martin Krutzki, designer of men's ready-to-wear
 2006–2018: Lucas Ossendrijver, men's collections
 2016–2017: Bouchra Jarrar, women's collections
 2017–2018: Olivier Lapidus, women's collections
 2018–2019: Estrella Archs, women's collections
 2019–Present: Bruno Sialelli, women's and men's collections

References

Bags (fashion)
Clothing brands of France
Fashion accessory brands
High fashion brands
Luxury brands
Shoe companies of France
Manufacturing companies based in Paris